On 26 May 2016, Iana Kasian was found dead in the apartment that she had shared with her fiancé in West Hollywood. Blake Leibel, her fiancé, was convicted of first-degree murder, torture and aggravated mayhem on 20 June 2018. On 26 June 2018, he was sentenced to life in prison without parole.

Background 

Blake Leibel (born May 8, 1981) is a former Canadian comic book creator and graphic novelist residing in Los Angeles. Leibel was born to two notable Canadian families. His father, Lorne Leibel, is of Jewish descent and is a prominent Toronto real estate mogul and Canadian Motorsport Hall of Fame inductee. Additionally, his father sailed for Canada in the 1976 Summer Olympics. His mother was Alros Products heiress Eleanor Chitel Leibel, whose father, Paul Chitel, held several patents. Leibel has a brother named Cody.

In 2010, Archaia published Leibel's graphic novel Syndrome, which was a joint venture with Leibel's company Fantasy Prone. The story revolved around a sadistic doctor and a serial killer he was studying. In the graphic novel, a serial killer murders a man by "by slitting his throat and hanging him by his ankles so he bled out." Leibel described the novel: "Syndrome is a story about obsession, on a number of levels, as experienced by four characters who all come from different worlds and yet find themselves embroiled in this giant, impeccably simulated environment... It's the ultimate 'backstage' story, in that sense."

Iana Kasian (Cyrillic: Яна Касьян; 27 January 1986 – 26 May 2016) was born in Kyiv, where she had studied law and worked as a prosecutor at the Ukrainian tax service. In 2014, she immigrated to the United States and worked as a model in California. After suddenly breaking up with his wife Amanda Braun in 2015, Leibel became engaged to Kasian. On 3 May 2016, Kasian gave birth to their daughter Diana.

Torture and murder of Iana Kasian 

Shortly after becoming engaged, Olga (Kasian's mother) went looking for Iana on May 24, 2016, after being unable to contact her, even after making more than ten calls. The day before, Iana had gone shopping for strollers for the baby; it was the last time Olga would see her daughter alive. Three weeks prior, Kasian had given birth to her and Leibel's daughter. When Olga got the police involved, two LASD officers attempted to conduct a search of Kasian's apartment. They knocked on the door but left after no one had answered. On another occasion, Olga went to the apartment alone and stood across the street, yelling at Leibel to open the door. She would testify that she "saw him approach the window, only to close it and disappear inside." 

Law enforcement officers found Iana Kasian's lifeless body on 26 May 2016 in an apartment that the couple had recently shared in West Hollywood, California. They found Kasian's body lying on the bed in the master bedroom, with Blake at her side. Prosecutors said there were indications that he had been lying next to her body, which had been cleaned, for some time before police arrived. Kasian was found mutilated, drained of blood and lying in their bed. The discovery was made following a barricade stand-off between Leibel and police officers. Leibel was subsequently charged with murder, torture, mayhem and aggravated mayhem, to which he pleaded not guilty. Their infant daughter was in the care of Kasian's mother who was visiting from Ukraine and staying in a nearby apartment.

An autopsy report was released on September 20, 2017, listing Kasian's causes of death as exsanguination and head trauma. A civil lawsuit filed by the victim's mother, Olga Kasian, included transcripts of Los Angeles County Coroner Dr. James Ribe's deposition, which stated:

Aftermath 

During the trial, prosecutors stated that Kassian's murder "stemmed from Leibel’s jealousy and anger over the baby as well as his need for power and control over his fiancée." Leibel's brother Cody was the only family member who attended the trial, attending every day. Leibel's ex-wife Amanda Braun also attended, and through a statement from her lawyer, expressed her dismay at the crime. 

On 20 June 2018, Leibel was convicted of first-degree murder, torture and aggravated mayhem. On 26 June 2018, he was sentenced to life in prison without parole. News media reported the crime as  "grisly" and possibly "the most gruesome murder in the history of West Hollywood if not Los Angeles". Leibel is currently serving his sentence at the California Correctional Institution.

References

External links 

Canadian people of Jewish descent
Canadian people convicted of murder
Criminals from Los Angeles
Prisoners and detainees of California
People convicted of murder by California
Prisoners sentenced to life imprisonment by California